Patrick Farrell, Garda Síochána #8232 (born 6 June 1909, date of death unknown) was a recipient of the Scott Medal.

Background
Farrell was born at Doon, Loughrea, County Galway. He had been a farmer prior to joining the Gardaí on 8 March 1932.

Incident at Kilsheelan
Farrell was awarded the Scott Bronze Medal by Minister for Justice Brian Lenihan in November 1966. It was in recognition of his valour during a violent incident lasting over an hour, at Kilsheelan, County Tipperary, on 12 June 1965, when he subdued a mentally-ill man brandishing a shotgun.

Farrell retired on 5 June 1972.

See also
 Yvonne Burke (Garda)
 Brian Connaughton
 Joseph Scott
 Deaths of Henry Byrne and John Morley (1980)
 Death of Jerry McCabe (1996)

References

 An Garda Síochána and the Scott Medal, Gerard O'Brien, Four Courts Press, 2008. 

People from County Galway
Garda Síochána officers
1909 births
Year of death missing
Recipients of the Scott Medal